Turok is a first-person shooter video game developed by Propaganda Games, and published by Disney Interactive Studios (through its Touchstone Games banner) for the PlayStation 3 and Xbox 360 in February 2008, later ported on to Microsoft Windows in April. This is the only game produced under the Touchstone Games label. The game is loosely based on the comic book series of the same title and is a reboot of previous Turok video games. Players assume the role of Native American space marine Joseph Turok, who is part of a team sent to a remote planet to apprehend General Roland Kane, Turok's former commanding officer, who is now a wanted war criminal. After crash landing, Turok discovers that the planet is home to all manner of dinosaurs, and must fight both the predatory creatures and Kane's private army on his mission to take down his former mentor. 

This was a first and only Touchstone Games video game made after his closure in 2008.

The game received mixed reviews from critics. A planned sequel to Turok was cancelled following the closure of Propaganda Games.

Gameplay
The gameplay of Turok is similar to that of most first-person shooters, with a strong focus on survival in dangerous natural environments. The human enemies, under the leadership of Kane, are the main threat to the player, although dinosaurs may often be found wandering throughout the game. The dinosaurs act as a neutral force and, if the player chooses, can be used as a tool to attack enemy soldiers. This may be done by attracting roaming dinosaurs to a firefight (via: flares, gunshots, etc.) to aid the player and help dispatch the enemy, with possible other ways depending on the situation. The dinosaurs' intelligence are much alike the Earth dinosaurs, so other dinosaurs and all humans, including the player's allies and enemies, may be attacked. The game does not utilize an aim-assist feature.

The developer Propaganda Games has included an additional, stealth mechanic in the game. Because Turok takes place mostly in jungle environments with a focus on ambiance, the player may kill enemies with a bow or knife without being heard or use dinosaurs to attract the attention of other enemies and slip by unnoticed. A famed new feature into this game is the Silent Kill, which is done by drawing the knife, then attacking a human or unaware dinosaur from behind. The kill can be utilized against dinosaurs and humans alike as a finishing blow, and can be executed from any side. The knife is also utilized as a self-defense weapon during phases known as "mauls", where the player is attacked by a dinosaur or bug, and must hammer on the according buttons in order to counter-attack or fend off the attack.

Multiplayer
Online multiplayer support is also available. There is a (Team) Deathmatch, Capture the Flag, Wargames, and Assault Capture the Flag. Multiplayer supports up to 16 people, and 4 players for three co-op missions. A feature in the multiplayer—randomly spawning computer-controlled dinosaurs and insects that appear in various locations in levels—adds a new factor to the gameplay. While players must worry about the opposing enemies, they must now also worry about the hostile dinosaurs that will be attempting to kill them. There can be up to 4 A.I controlled dinosaurs or insects on any map at one time. Splitscreen multiplayer, however, is not supported in any form.

Originally, the Xbox 360 version of Turok was set to feature an achievement called "Grab Bag", which required players to kill at least one enemy, one dinosaur, one teammate, and themselves, all in the same match. This caused controversy on the Internet as the achievement essentially rewarded players for team killing. Josh Holmes, a representative of Propaganda Games, described the creation of the Achievement by saying: "What we found was that players playing their first match in Turok – almost every player – was (accidentally) killing himself, a team mate and an enemy with a grenade or a Stick [sic] Bomb gun and so we thought 'hey, we should give them an achievement for that', as kind of a joke". He went on to say that developers were planning to release a patch removing Grab Bag if excessive team killing became a problem after launch. In the launch version of the game, the achievement removed the requirement of killing a teammate, and is awarded after the player kills an enemy, a dinosaur, and themselves in the same match. A Map pack called the "Velociraptor Pack" was later released, containing two new multiplayer maps, one new Co-op map, and 2 refurbished maps, which now take place at night.

The online multiplayer for the PlayStation 3 version has been permanently shutdown since February 2011.

Plot
Kiowa Corporal Joseph Turok (Gregory Cruz), alongside fellow members of Whiskey Company, is tasked with apprehending war criminal General Roland Kane (Powers Boothe), who has resurfaced on a backwater planet after disappearing for several years. Unbeknownst to Whiskey Company, the planet is controlled by the Mendel-Grumman (M-G) Corporation, with Kane commanding an army of M-G soldiers. Kane is also the former leader of Wolf Pack, an elite specialized black ops detachment. Turok was a member of this unit but left over its ideals during a mission in Colombia. Whiskey Company member Slade (Ron Perlman) holds a grudge against Turok because his brother, also a member of Wolf Pack, was killed during that mission.

On approach, Whiskey Company is shot down and crash lands on the terraformed planet, scattering the group. The land is populated by genetically-engineered dinosaurs created by M-G to use as weapons. Turok finds senior NCO Sergeant Henderson (Steve Van Wormer), who is killed by a Utahraptor, and then Slade; the two reunite with sniper Reese (Gideon Emery).

Reaching the crash site, the survivors locate more of Whiskey Company: leader Cole, second-in-command Lewis, Chief Engineer Carter (Jason Harris), heavy weapons trooper Jericho (Christopher Judge), weapons specialist Logan (William Fichtner), Whiskey Company's medic Parker (Joshua Gomez), technician and pilot Shepard (Donnie Wahlberg), and soldiers Foster (Jon Curry) and Gonzales (Lombardo Boyar). Tasked with finding the ship's comm unit, Turok encounters John Grimes (Sean Donnellan), Kane's second-in-command, and later another survivor, Cowboy (Timothy Olyphant), who is shot by Grimes. Whiskey Company comes to Cowboy's aid, and Turok resumes his search with Foster and Gonzales. After Foster is killed by a M-G sniper, Turok and Gonzales recover the comm unit. Gonzales is snatched by a large T. Rex. Turok injures the T. Rex, but is knocked unconscious.

Turok wakes and makes his way back to camp with the comm unit, where Slade accuses him of again betraying his comrades. Cole (Mark Rolston) is killed in a surprise attack by Grimes, and M-G troops storm the area. Whiskey Company fends off the attack, but Parker and Lewis are killed and the comm unit is destroyed. Logan assumes command; he orders Turok, Slade, and Carter to investigate some distant searchlights.

Reaching an abandoned outpost, the trio find that Kane has derived a potent neurotoxin taken from scorpion-like creatures, as well as the location of a ship in a substation near the M-G base. The scorpion-like creatures attack them, killing Carter, while Turok and Slade fall into a cave system. Turok saves Slade from a large tenatacled creature, earning Slade's respect. They escape the caves and link up with the remainder of Whiskey Company.

An approaching M-G patrol causes Logan to accuse Turok of betraying Whiskey Company, but Slade defends Turok. The patrol inadvertently discovers them and Logan is killed. The group fight their way to the substation and Jericho sacrifices himself to allow them access. They find the ship derelict, and travel to the M-G base in search of another. At the entrance, Reese is killed by Grimes from afar. Making their way inside, indirectly helped by the T. Rex that Turok had fought earlier, the group further learn that Kane has developed a lethal nerve gas from the scorpion creatures. To prevent the bio-weapon from leaving the planet, Turok sets explosive charges on the base's generators. Kane captures them and kills Cowboy for speaking out, but Turok detonates the charges, resulting in the death of Grimes.

Turok, Shepard, and Slade flee from the collapsing base. They reach another ship but Turok refuses to leave until Kane is dead. Turok shoots down Kane's ship, and they engage in a knife fight, ending in Turok killing Kane. The T. Rex confronts Turok, who pushes a grenade into her ruptured eye which explodes, killing her. Turok is picked up by Shepard and Slade in their ship, and they set a course back to Earth.

Development
The game was in development for 3 years with a team of 150 people.

Reception

Turok received "mixed or average" reviews, according to review aggregator Metacritic.

GameTrailers, which gave the game 8.3/10, highlighted the game's use of the Unreal Engine 3, believing it to be "the best use of the tech outside of Epic's own efforts" and praising the modeling and animation of the dinosaurs in particular. 1UP.com gave the game a score of C+, specifically complaining about its stealth mechanics, the use of camera shaking, and occasional graphical glitches in the PlayStation 3 version.  Hyper'''s Yuri Spadeface commended the game for its "solid frame rate" but he criticised the "frustrating level design and average execution". Turok received 3/5 from X-Play, who commented on its aim-assist being woefully inadequate both in multiplayer and singleplayer, but praised its graphics and "outlook".Turok'' was a commercial success, shifting over 1 million units in its first two months of sales. The game was popular enough for Propaganda Games to begin working on a sequel for the Xbox 360 before the developer was shuttered.

References

External links
 

2008 video games
Aspyr games
Cooperative video games
Dinosaurs in video games
Disney video games
First-person shooters
Multiplayer and single-player video games
Native Americans in popular culture
PlayStation 3 games
Unreal Engine games
Video game reboots
Video games based on Turok
Video games developed in Canada
Video games set in North America
Video games set on fictional planets
Windows games
Xbox 360 games